The Basketball Bundesliga Finals MVP (German: Wertvollster Spieler der Finalserie) is an annual Basketball Bundesliga (BBL) award given since the 2004–05 season to the league's most valuable player in the Finals of the league.

Winners

Notes

References

External links
German League official website 

Basketball Bundesliga awards